Eden is a city in Concho County, Texas, United States. The population was 2,766 at the 2010 census.
The community is a rural trading center for agricultural products for the many large ranches and farms in West Texas.

History
The earliest settlers were the family of Harvey and Louisa McCarty.  Frederick Ede and his family moved to the area around 1881.  In 1882, Ede donated  of land to be used as a townsite and to build a town square.  The following year, a post office was established and was named "Eden", an adaptation of Frederick Ede's name.

A school was established in 1885.

By 1890, Eden had a general store, a jeweler, a saloon, a Baptist church (organized in 1886), and a population exceeding 100.  A newspaper, The Eden Echo, was founded in 1906.  That same year, a bank was established.  Telephone service arrived about 1907, and a public well and windmill were installed in 1908.

Eden was incorporated on February 4, 1911.  That same year, the Gulf, Colorado and Santa Fe Railway completed a  line between Eden and Lometa, located east of Eden.

By 1914, Eden had a restaurant, two general stores, two hotels, two cotton gins, two lumber companies, two hardware stores, a Baptist church, and a Methodist church.  The population was 600.

The Eden Independent School District was established in 1920, and electricity arrived in Eden in 1925.

Eden became a trading center for mohair and wool after 1925, as sheep ranching in the area increased.  Local ranchers also began raising cattle and goats, as well as polo ponies for eastern markets.

In 1961, the first F-105 fighter-bomber delivered to the US Air Force 49th Tactical Fighter Wing was named the "Kordel-Eden", after Kordel, Germany, and the pilot's hometown of Eden, Texas.

Geography

Climate
The climate in this area is characterized by hot, humid summers and generally mild to cool winters.  According to the Köppen climate classification system, Eden has a humid subtropical climate, Cfa on climate maps.

Demographics

2020 census

As of the 2020 United States census, there were 1,100 people, 352 households, and 223 families residing in the city.

2000 census
As of the census of 2000, 2,561 people, 499 households, and 333 families resided in the city. The population density was 1,055.2 people per square mile (406.9/km). The 602 housing units averaged 248.0 per square mile (95.7/km). The racial makeup of the city was 90.63% White, 1.52% African American, 0.35% Native American, 0.04% Asian, 0.16% Pacific Islander, 6.48% from other races, and 0.82% from two or more races. Hispanics or Latinos of any race were 51.43% of the population.

Of the 499 households, 32.1% had children under the age of 18 living with them, 51.9% were married couples living together, 12.8% had a female householder with no husband present, and 33.1% were not families. About 31.7% of all households were made up of individuals, and 17.6% had someone living alone who was 65 years of age or older. The average household size was 2.39 and the average family size was 3.00.

In the city, the population was distributed as 12.3% under the age of 18, 12.7% from 18 to 24, 47.4% from 25 to 44, 16.6% from 45 to 64, and 11.0% who were 65 years of age or older. The median age was 34 years. For every 100 females, there were 262.2 males. For every 100 females age 18 and over, there were 320.6 males.

The median income for a household in the city was $28,636, and for a family was $34,750. Males had a median income of $17,341 versus $20,000 for females. The per capita income for the city was $12,119. About 8.8% of families and 15.6% of the population were below the poverty line, including 21.8% of those under age 18 and 16.9% of those age 65 or over.

Education
The City of Eden is served by the Eden Consolidated Independent School District.  Eden Elementary School and Eden High School are located in the city.

Infrastructure
The United States Postal Service operates the Eden Post Office.

The Eden Detention Center incarcerates male federal prisoners who are primarily criminal aliens who will be deported upon release.  The facility is operated by Corrections Corporation of America on behalf of the Federal Bureau of Prisons, employs 285 staff, and has a capacity of 1,558 inmates.

Concho County Hospital is a 16-bed general medical and surgical hospital in Eden.  It has an emergency room, and four staff doctors.

Notable people

 Gwinn Henry, football player and coach
 James Earl Rudder, US Army general and president of Texas A&M University:  The James Earl Rudder Memorial Park is located in the Eden town square

Gallery

References

External links

Cities in Texas
Cities in Concho County, Texas